Ruslan Nikolaevich Murashov (born 29 December 1992) is a Russian speed skater.

Personal life
Murashov is a former Ice hockey player in the Moscow club "Chemist" Voskresensk until he was 15 years old when he switched to training speed skating in Kolomna.

Career
In 2011–2012, Murashov competed in the Junior World Cup series in 1000m and 500m. He debuted as a Senior in the 2013 season and competed at the 2013 Winter Universiade in Trentino, Italy. Murashov did not make the list and qualify for the Russian National team to compete at the 2014 Sochi Olympics.

In 2014–15, Murashov competed in men's 500m at the 2014–15 ISU World Cup at the first leg of the series in Obihiro, Japan he took the bronze medal behind teammate Pavel Kulizhnikov and another bronze in Seoul, Korea. At the Final of the World Cup in Erfurt, Germany, he won the gold clocking a time in 34.97; the results placed him 3rd in the overall rankings for the 2014–15 Season behind Canadian Laurent Dubreuil in men's 500m.

In the 2015/16 Season. Murashov opened his season finishing 7th in men's 500m and a bronze in Team Sprint (with Aleksey Yesin and Artyom Kuznetsov) at the 2015–16 ISU Speed Skating World Cup in Calgary. At the 2015–16 ISU Speed Skating World Cup in Heerenveen, Murashov won silver in Team sprint (with Aleksey Yesin, Artyom Kuznetsov and Kiril Golubev), and won his first individual medal of the season, gold in 500 m in a time of 34.67. At the ISU World Cup in Stavanger Murashov won the silver medal in men's 500 m behind teammate Pavel Kulizhnikov. On 11–14 February, at the 2016 World Single Distance Speed Skating Championships in Kolomna, Murashov won the silver medal in men's 500 m behind teammate Pavel Kulizhnikov. Murashov then competed at the 2016 World Sprint Speed Skating Championships in Seoul, South Korea and finished 11th in the overall classification. On 11–13 March, at the World Cup Final in Heerenveen, Murashov won gold and silver in 500m. His results rank him 2nd in the overall rankings for the 2015–16 World Cup Season behind teammate Pavel Kulizhnikov in men's 500m.

Murashov won the 500 m event at the 2019 World Single Distances Championships with a track record of 34.225.

World Cup results

World Cup podiums

Overall rankings

References

External links

Ruslan Murashov bio page 	
Ruslan Murashov Sports Bio
Murashov Trentino2013

1992 births
Russian male speed skaters
People from Kolomna
Living people
World Single Distances Speed Skating Championships medalists
Speed skaters at the 2022 Winter Olympics
Olympic speed skaters of Russia
Sportspeople from Moscow Oblast